Artern station is a railway station in the municipality of Artern, located in the Kyffhäuserkreis district in Thuringia, Germany.

References

Railway stations in Thuringia
Buildings and structures in Kyffhäuserkreis